Rotterdam Business School (RBS; distinct from Rotterdam School of Management, Erasmus University) was founded in Rotterdam, the Netherlands in 1990 as the International School of Economics Rotterdam, which developed study programmes in English.  RBS is part of Rotterdam University of Applied Sciences and offers three types of study programmes: Bachelor, Master, and Special.

External links
 official website

Business schools in the Netherlands